Coprinopsis acuminata, commonly known as the humpback inkcap mushroom and earlier as Coprinus acuminatus, is a coprophilous fungus that grows on herbivore dung. It is heterothallic.

Taxonomy
Coprinopsis acuminata was first described as Coprinus acuminatus in 1969 and later as Coprinopsis acuminata.

References

External links
 Coprinopsis acuminata (Romagn.) Redhead, Vilgalys & Moncalvo 2001, Encyclopedia of Life

acuminata
Fungi described in 2001